Forte Boccea is one of the 15 forts of Rome, built in the period between 1877 and 1891 as a part of the "entrenched field of Rome".
It is located in Rome (Italy), in the Suburb S. IX Aurelio, within the Municipio XIII.

History 

It was used as a military remand prison until 2005; in 2013 a resolution was approved, establishing its conversion into a park for cultural initiatives. General Mario Carloni was a prisoner there from 1946 to 19 May 1951.

Notes

Bibliography

External links 
 
 

Forts in Italy